Katha Karana Heena (Dreams Without My Tears) is a 2019 Sri Lankan Sinhala children's film directed and produced by Somalatha Herath Menike. It stars Buddhika Jayaratne, Semini Iddamalgoda and Chandrasoma Binduhewa in lead roles along with many child actors. Music co-composed by Sujith Milroy and Prasanna Sanjeewa. It is the 1325th Sri Lankan film in the Sinhala cinema.

Plot

Cast
 Buddhika Jayaratne
 Semini Iddamalgoda
 Chandrasoma Binduhewa
 Ananda Atukorale
 Maneesha Shymali
 Dinul Ransith
 Anjana Premaratne
 Buddhika Kalindu
 Ranil Prasad
 Mahinda Karunaratne
 Sujani Hettiarachchi
 Amaya Muyulasi
 Adeesha Rathnayake

References

2019 films
2010s Sinhala-language films